Boxes is the eleventh studio album by American rock band Goo Goo Dolls. It was released on May 6, 2016, through Warner Bros. Records. It marks the band's first album since A Boy Named Goo recorded without drummer Mike Malinin, who was removed from the band in 2013, and their first album to be recorded as duo. Upon, release, Boxes debuted and peaked at #27 on the Billboard 200 albums chart, with first week sales of 15,000 copies. The album marks the first studio album released by the band to not debut in the top ten since 1998's Dizzy Up the Girl.

Singles
The lead single from Boxes, "So Alive", was released on April 8, 2016. A second single, "Over And Over", was released to radio on October 12 of the same year, along with an official lyric video.

Critical reception

Stephen Thomas Erlewine of AllMusic rated the album three out of five stars and states: "(The band) unapologetically embraces their middle age, excising any remaining hints of the raucous rock band of yore and splitting their time between power ballads and insistent anthems."

Track listing
Credits adapted from ASCAP.

Personnel
Credits adapted from AllMusic and album's liner notes.

Goo Goo Dolls
 John Rzeznik – guitar, vocals (1-5, 7-9, 11), background vocals (3, 8, 9)
 Robby Takac – bass guitar, vocals (6, 10)

Musicians
 Mike Adubato – keyboards (9), piano (3, 6, 8-11)
 Yazz Alali – background vocals (5)
 John Alicastro – background vocals (9)
 Brad Fernquist – guitar (1, 2, 4, 5, 7)
 Clare Fisher – violin (10)
 Gretchen Fisher – violin (10)
 Kiersten Fisher – viola (10)
 Derek A.E. Fuhrmann – guitar (3, 6, 8, 10, 11), piano (3, 6, 10), background vocals (3, 8-11)
 George Hattori – guitar (10)
 Rachel Kanner – background vocals (9)
 Kim Kat – background vocals (2)
 Michael Lauri – background vocals (9)
 Craig MacIntyre – drums (1, 2, 4, 5, 7), percussion (4)
 Jordan Miller – background vocals (9, 11)
 Mark Neisser – background vocals (3)
 Gunnar Olsen – drums (3, 8, 9, 11), guitar (3, 8)
 Drew Pearson – keyboards (4)
 Shawn Pelton – drums (6, 10)
 Sydney Sierota - vocals (3)
 Kit Walters – background vocals (10, 11)
 Gregg Wattenberg – guitar (3, 6, 8, 11), background vocals (3, 8-11)
 Katie Weissman – cello (10)

Technical
 Mike Adubato – engineer (3, 6, 8-11), programming (9)
 Jeffery David – vocal production (3)
 Emerson Day – assistant engineer (1-5)
 Mark Endert – mixing
 Richie English – string arrangements (10)
 Nicolas Essig – assistant engineer (7)
 Kevin J. Estrada – engineer (1-5, 7)
 Derek A.E. Fuhrmann – production (3, 6, 8-11), programming (3, 6, 10)
 Doug Johnson – mixing assistant
 Justin Rose – engineer (9, 10), string production and engineering (10)
 Drew Pearson – production (1, 2, 4, 5, 7), engineer (1, 2, 4, 5, 7)
 Gregg Wattenberg – production (3, 6, 8-11), programming (3, 6, 10)
Tom Coyne - mastering engineer

Charts

Release history
Source: Amazon.com

In popular culture
The single, "So Alive", was used in a 2017 television advertisement for BMW.

References

External links
 

2016 albums
Goo Goo Dolls albums
Warner Records albums